The 2011 Big Ten Conference baseball tournament was held at Huntington Park in Columbus, Ohio, from May 23 through 26. Top seeded  won their fourth tournament title and claimed the Big Ten Conference's automatic bid to the 2011 NCAA Division I baseball tournament.

Regular season results
The top six teams (based on conference results, with head-to-head results serving as tiebreakers) from the conference earn invites to the tournament.

Format
The 2011 tournament was a 6-team double-elimination tournament.  The top two seeds received a single bye into the semifinals (2nd Round). The 1 seed played the lowest seeded Round 1 winner, while the 2 seed played the highest seeded Round 1 winner.

Bracket

References

Tournament
Big Ten baseball tournament
Big Ten Baseball Tournament
Big Ten baseball tournament